"Sweets" for the Sweet is an album  by trumpeter Harry "Sweets" Edison that was recorded in 1964 and released by the Sue label.

Critical reception

AllMusic reviewer Ken Dryden stated "Veteran trumpeter Harry "Sweets" Edison is awash in strings on this collection of ballads ... Edison's solos, whether muted or with open horn, are enjoyable, though rather reserved due to the nature of the arrangements. ... this disc will be of minimal interest to jazz fan".

Track listing 
 "What Is There to Say?" (Vernon Duke, Yip Harburg) – 2:02
 "I Wish You Love" (Léo Chauliac, Charles Trenet, Albert Beach) – 3:08
 "Call Me Irresponsible" (Jimmy Van Heusen, Sammy Cahn) – 2:45
 "Willow Weep for Me" (Ann Ronell) – 2:46
 "But Beautiful" (Van Heuson, Johnny Burke) – 3:03
 "Blues for Christine" (Harry Edison) – 2:29
 "On Green Dolphin Street" (Bronisław Kaper, Ned Washington) – 2:42
 "Hello, Dolly!" (Jerry Herman) – 2:52
 "Everything Happens to Me" (Matt Dennis, Tom Adair) – 3:20	
 "Days of Wine and Roses" (Henry Mancini, Johnny Mercer) – 2:57
 "Carpetbaggers" (Elmer Bernstein) – 3:33
 "Sweets for the Sweet" (Edison) – 3:38

Personnel 
"Sweets" Edison – trumpet
Don Abney, Gerald Wiggins – piano
Leroy Vinnegar – bass
Jackie Mills – drums
Unidentified orchestra

References

1964 albums
Harry Edison albums
Sue Records albums